Tamilnadia is a genus of flowering plants belonging to the family Rubiaceae.

Its native range is Indian subcontinent to Indo-China.

Species:

Tamilnadia uliginosa

References

Rubiaceae
Rubiaceae genera